Mona Barthel and Kristýna Plíšková were the defending champions, but Plíšková chose not to participate. 

Eri Hozumi and Peangtarn Plipuech won the title, defeating Barthel and Hsieh Yu-chieh in the final, 7–5, 6–2.

Seeds

Draw

Draw

References

External Links
Main Draw

Chicago Challenger - Doubles
2021 Doubles